The Little Britain Merchants are a junior C ice hockey team based in Little Britain, Ontario, Canada.  They played in the Central Ontario Junior C Hockey League of the Ontario Hockey Association until the 2016–17 season when the league became the Orr Division of the Provincial Junior Hockey League.

History
The Little Britain Merchants were founded in 1978 as members of the Southern Counties Junior D Hockey League.

In 1984, the Merchants move to the Central Lakeshore Junior C Hockey League.  Two year later, the league merged with the Quinte-St. Lawrence Junior C Hockey League and formed the Central Ontario Junior C Hockey League. The expansion of the Merchants was to fill the void left by the folding of the Stouffville Clippers.  The Merchants advanced to the Central Lakeshore Final that season where they would be swept by the Bowmanville Eagles who went on to the Clarence Schmalz Cup semifinals.

In the 1997–98 season, the Merchants finished first overall in the Central Ontario league regular season with 27 wins in 40 games.  The Merchants won their first league championship that season and advanced to the Clarence Schmalz Cup semifinals where they were defeated by the eventual Schmalz Cup Champions Glanbrook Rangers of the Niagara District League.

The Merchants finished the 2005–06 regular season in second place overall.  In the league semi-final, the Merchants drew the third seeded Uxbridge Bruins where the series went the full seven games with the Bruins taking the series 4-games-to-3. The 2006–07 regular season ended with the Merchants finishing in third place overall.  Their semi-final opponent was the second seeded Port Perry Mojacks, which again went to a game seven before the Merchants were elimated.

Little Britain won their second league championship in 2009–10 when they upset the defending champion Uxbridge Bruins.  The Merchants advanced to the Clarence Schmalz Cup quarterfinals against the Empire B champion Napanee Raiders.  The series featured each team winning at home with the Raiders advancing in seven games.

Season-by-season results

References

External links
 Little Britain Merchants 

Ice hockey teams in Ontario